Estrella Hospital is a small, older Philippines hospital located at 43 Gen. Aguinaldo Highway km, 4118 Silang, Cavite on the highway between Cavite City and Tagaytay. It has twenty-five inpatient beds. Estrella Hospital, privately owned, is listed by the Philippine Department of Health as a level 2 hospital.

References

Hospitals in the Philippines
Buildings and structures in Cavite
Silang, Cavite